Hugh George Webb (14 November 1878 – 14 September 1958) was an Australian rules footballer who played with Geelong in the Victorian Football League (VFL).

Notes

External links 

1878 births
1958 deaths
Australian rules footballers from Victoria (Australia)
Geelong Football Club players